John Francis Mercer (May 17, 1759 – August 30, 1821) was a Founding Father of the United States, politician, lawyer, planter, and slave owner from Virginia and Maryland. An officer during the Revolutionary War, Mercer intitially served in the Virginia House of Delegates and then the Maryland State Assembly. As a member of the assembly, he was appointed a delegate from Maryland to the Philadelphia Convention of 1787, where he was a framer of the U.S. Constitution though he left the convention before signing. Mercer was later elected to the U.S. House of Representatives from two different districts in Maryland. In 1801—1803, he served as Maryland's 10th governor.

Early and family life

Mercer was born in 1759 at Marlborough plantation in Stafford County in the Colony of Virginia, to prominent lawyer, planter and investor in western lands John Mercer and his second wife, the former Ann Roy. His father John Mercer fathered 19 children by two wives, although many died before reaching adulthood. His namesake half-brother, Captain John Fenton Mercer (1735-1756)) was killed and scalped in western Virginia during the French and Indian War. His elder half brothers George Mercer and James Mercer served in the Virginia House of Burgesses, and James also became a prominent lawyer and served in Virginia revolutionary conventions, the Virginia House of Delegates and the Continental Congress (1779-1780) before becoming a judge, ultimately of what later became the Virginia Supreme Court. Mercer also had several sisters and half-sisters who survived to adulthood, including Sarah Mercer who married Col. Samuel Selden of Stafford County, Mary Mercer who married Daniel McCarty Jr. of Westmoreland County, Grace Mercer who married Muscoe Garnett of Essex County, and Maria Mercer who married Richard Brooke of King and Queen County. His younger brother Robert Mercer (1764-1800) would marry Mildred Carter, daughter of prominent planter Landon Carter, and become a lawyer and editor of the "Genius of Liberty". Like all his brothers who lived to adulthood, Mercer attended the College of William and Mary, and graduated in 1775.

On February 3, 1785, he married heiress Sophia Sprigg, daughter of Richard Sprigg and Margaret Caile of Anne Arundel County, Maryland. They had at least four children, including Margaret Mercer, who became an abolitionist and freed all the slaves she inherited upon her father's death. His nephew, congressman Charles Fenton Mercer, also opposed slavery and was president of the American Colonization Society.

Career 

During the American Revolutionary War, Mercer accepted a commission as lieutenant in the 3rd Virginia Regiment in the Continental Army. He was wounded at the Battle of Brandywine, and received a promotion to captain in 1777. On June 8, 1778 he became an aide-de-camp with the rank of major to General Charles Lee. 

He resigned from the army when Lee did in October 1779, but recruited a cavalry company for the Virginia militia as the British navy discharged Tarleton's Raiders and others to raid plantations in Chesapeake Bay. Thus he held the rank of lieutenant colonel and served briefly under Lafayette as he led troops at the Battle of Guildford, Battle of Green Spring, siege of Yorktown and other locations.

After General Cornwallis' surrender in 1781, Stafford County voters elected Mercer as one of their two representatives in the Virginia House of Delegates in 1782, where he served alongside Charles Carter. Fellow legislators selected Mercer as one of Virginia's delegates to the Continental Congress in both 1783 and 1784. When Richard Brent died, a special election to fill his place as Stafford County's delegate to the Virginia House of Delegates was held, and John Francis Mercer took his place for the rest of the session. 

In 1785 Mercer married his wife, and soon moved to Anne Arundel County, Maryland, where he operated her estates using enslaved labor. He owned slaves in 1810 and 1820. Mercer owned 72 slaves by the time he died in 1821.

Meanwhile, Mercer became one of Maryland's delegates to the Philadelphia Convention in 1787, but because he was opposed to centralization, withdrew before signing the Constitution. [He also represented fellow anti-ratification delegate George Mason as a private lawyer collecting debts owed to Mason by Maryland residents.] Mercer was also a delegate to the Maryland State Convention of 1788, to vote whether Maryland should ratify the proposed Constitution of the United States. He served terms in the Maryland State Assembly in 1788-89 and 1791-92 before being elected to represent Maryland in the United States House of Representatives from the second and third districts from 1792 to 1794, resigning on April 13, 1794. He again served in the Maryland House of Delegates (1800-1801) before winning election as the tenth Governor of Maryland (for two one-year terms) from 1801 to 1803.

Although he again served in the Maryland House of Delegates in 1803-1806 (and joined with the Federalists during Thomas Jefferson's Presidency), illness plagued Mercer in his later years

Death and legacy
Mercer traveled to Philadelphia, Pennsylvania to seek medical attention, and died on August 30, 1821. Although a funeral was held at St. Peter's Church in Philadelphia, his remains were returned to his "Cedar Park" estate in Maryland for burial..

Notes

External links
 
 Mercer biography at the University of Groningen, Netherlands

1759 births
1821 deaths
Continental Army officers from Virginia
Continental Congressmen from Virginia
18th-century American politicians
Governors of Maryland
Members of the Maryland House of Delegates
Members of the United States House of Representatives from Maryland
College of William & Mary alumni
People from Anne Arundel County, Maryland
Virginia militiamen in the American Revolution
Mercer family of Virginia
People of colonial Maryland
Virginia colonial people
People from Stafford County, Virginia
American planters
Maryland Democratic-Republicans
Democratic-Republican Party state governors of the United States
American slave owners
Founding Fathers of the United States